Mull House and Cemetery is a historic home and cemetery located at Coeymans in Albany County, New York.  It was built about 1825 and is a rectangular, -story timber frame dwelling on a stone foundation in the Federal style.  It is topped by a gambrel roof.  The cemetery includes approximately 12 extant markers. Also on the property is a barn dated to about 1890.

It was listed on the National Register of Historic Places in 1999.

References

Houses on the National Register of Historic Places in New York (state)
Federal architecture in New York (state)
Houses completed in 1825
Houses in Albany County, New York
National Register of Historic Places in Albany County, New York